Getin Holding S.A. is a financial holding company, formed in Warsaw in 1996. The Holding started its activity as an electronic business center, becoming the leader in the IT sector for small and medium-sized businesses in Poland, providing IT, CRM and ERP solutions for Polish companies. Main shareholder is a Polish billionaire Leszek Czarnecki.

Getin Holding invests in banks, insurance, leasing and brokerage companies. Holding includes Idea Bank (with divisions in Poland, Romania, Ukraine, Belarus and formerly Russia), Getin Leasing, Noble Bank, Open Finance, Powszechny Dom Kredytowy, Fiolet TU Europa, Noble Funds, Carcade Leasing (Russia, Ukraine, Poland, Belarus).

Structure
 Getin Noble Bank  (7,41%)
 Noble Bank 
 Getin Bank 
 Open Finance
 Noble Funds TFI
 Noble Securities
 Getin Leasing
 Noble Concierge
 Idea Bank
 Idea Bank (Russia) 2011—2015
 Idea Bank (Belarus)
 Idea Bank (Ukraine)
 Idea Bank (Romania)
 Idea Leasing
 MW Trade
 Carcade

References 

Companies based in Warsaw
Companies listed on the Warsaw Stock Exchange
Financial services companies established in 1996
Financial services companies of Poland
Polish brands